Oteo is a hamlet and council located in the municipality of Campezo/Kanpezu, in Álava province, Basque Country, Spain. As of 2020, it has a population of 23.

Geography 
Oteo is located 57km east-southeast of Vitoria-Gasteiz.

References

Populated places in Álava